This is a list of the best-selling singles in 2020 in Japan, physical and digital sales are taken from Oricon year-end chart.

Combined sales

Physical sales

Digital sales (single track)

See also
List of Oricon number-one singles of 2020

References

2020 in Japanese music
Japanese music-related lists
2020
Oricon